The 2014 Lambeth Council election was held on 22 May 2014 to elect members of Lambeth Council in Greater London, England. This was on the same day as other local elections. The election saw the Labour Party further increase its majority on the council, winning all but four of the 63 council seats.

Notably, the Liberal Democrats lost all 15 of their seats, but one of their seats in Bishop's ward was lost by under 35 votes.

The Liberal Democrats finished as the runners up in 4 wards, the Conservatives in 8, the Greens in 6, Labour in 2 and UKIP in 1.

Summary of results

Results by ward 
* - Existing Councillor seeking re-election.

Bishop's

Brixton Hill

Clapham Common

Clapham Town

Coldharbour

- Rachel Heywood was elected as a Labour Councillor. Heywood resigned the party whip in April 2016 and now sits as an Independent councillor.

Ferndale

Gipsy Hill

Herne Hill

Knight's Hill

Larkhall

Oval

Prince's

St Leonard's

Stockwell

Streatham Hill

Streatham South

Streatham Wells

Thornton

Thurlow Park

Tulse Hill

Vassall

By-elections: 2014–2018

Knight's Hill 

 

The by-election was triggered when the incumbent Councillor, Sonia Winifred, was disqualified as she was still employed by the council at the time of the previous election. Winifred was re-elected.

 

 

 

 

The by-election was held following death of the incumbent Councillor. It was subsequently retained by Labour with a significantly reduced majority.

EU referendum 2016

During the 2016 United Kingdom European Union membership referendum Lambeth voted 78% to remain in the EU and 22% to leave. Two of the three Labour MPs backed Remain, Chuka Umunna and Helen Hayes, whereas Vauxhall MP Kate Hoey backed Leave.

References

Lambeth
2014
21st century in the London Borough of Lambeth